Coso Rock Art District is a rock art site containing over 100,000 Petroglyphs by Paleo-Indians and/or Native Americans. The district is located near the towns of China Lake and Ridgecrest, California. Big and Little Petroglyph Canyons were declared a National Historic Landmark in 1964. In 2001, they were incorporated into this larger National Historic Landmark District.  There are several other distinct canyons in the Coso Rock Art District besides the Big and Little Petroglyph Canyons. Also known as Little Petroglyph Canyon and Sand Tanks, Renegade Canyon is but one of several major canyons in the Coso Range, each hosting thousands of petroglyphs (other locations include Haiwee Springs, Dead End Canyon, and Sheep Canyon). The majority of the Coso Range images fall into one of six categories: bighorn sheep, entopic images, anthropomorphic or human-like figures (including animal-human figures known as pattern-bodied anthopomorphs), other animals, weapons & tools, and "medicine bag" images.

Most of the Coso Range is on the Naval Air Weapons Station China Lake, where visitation is restricted, vandalism is low, and preservation is most likely. The Coso Range is between the Sierra Nevada and the Argus Range. Indian Wells Valley lies to the south of this location. This north-south trending range of about  consists of rhyolitic domes and outcrops of volcanic rock. The most popular subjects are bighorn sheep, deer, and antelope.

A November 2007 Los Angeles Times''' Travel feature article includes it within a top 15 list of California places to visit. The area was also mentioned in Groupon's "10 Most Unique Autumn Festivals in the Country" as a part of the Ridgecrest Petroglyph Festival.

Prehistory detail

According to that article: "No one knows for sure who decorated Little Petroglyph Canyon with images out of a dreamscape, some thought to be more than 10,000 years old. Or why the basalt walls of a narrow wash in the bone-dry Coso Mountains at the northern edge of the Mojave Desert became a magic canvas for flocks of bighorn sheep, hunters with bows and arrows poised and more. But the area is probably the richest Amerindian Petroglyph / rock-art site in the Western hemisphere. To see the canyon, one must contact either the Navy Base, or join a scheduled tour offered by Maturango Museum in Ridgecrest, California or attend a Rock Art 101 program. A 40-mile drive on paved road except for the last 6 miles to access the trailhead, followed by a hike and a scramble along the canyon. Visits are scheduled only in the spring and fall."

There is considerable archaeological evidence substantiating trade between the Coso People, possibly of the Northern Utoaztecan affiliation Paiute tribe, and other Indigenous peoples of the Americas and  Native American tribes. For example, distant trade with the Chumash People is confirmed by archaeological recovery from coastal California sites in San Luis Obispo County and in prehistoric sites on the Channel Islands.

See also
 Coso People
 Paleo-Indians
 Mesoamerica
 Native Americans in the United States	
 Population history of American indigenous peoples

References

Further reading
Whitley, David S.  "By the Hunter, for the Gatherer: Art, Social Relations and Subsistence Change in the Prehistoric Great Basin".  World Archaeology 25.3 (1994): 356-373.
Garfinkel, Alan P. 1978 "Coso" Style Pictographs of the Southern Sierra Nevada.  Journal of California Anthropology 5(1):94-101. [Reports on two sites in Indian Wells Canyon with painted images similar to the Coso Representational bighorn images.  Concludes that these are the product of historic activities of the Kawaiisu and/or Panamint Shoshone and likely do not show cultural continuity but are probably evidence of the historic copying of more ancient imagery.]
1980 A Cultural Resource Management Plan for the Fossil Falls/Little Lake Locality.  U.S. Bureau of Land Management, Cultural Resources Publications, Archaeology. Bakersfield, 1980. Reprinted by Coyote Press, Salinas, California.    Available on-line at: http://www.blm.gov/heritage/adventures/research/StatePages/PDFs/California/little%20lake.pdf
2003 Dating "Classic" Coso Style Sheep Petroglyphs in the Coso Range and El Paso Mountains: Implications for Regional Prehistory.  Society for California Archaeology Newsletter 37(4):34-37.
2005 Comment on Clarus Backes' "More Than Meets the Eye: Fluorescence Photography for Enhanced Analysis of Pictographs."  Journal of California and Great Basin Anthropology 26(2):95-99.  R
2006 Paradigm Shifts, Rock Art Theory, and the Coso Sheep Cult of Eastern California.  North American Archaeologist 27(3):203-244. [Evaluation of hunting magic model versus individual shamanism as the primary function for the imagery represented in the Coso Representational Style petroglyph complex in the Coso Range of eastern California.]
2007 Archaeology and Rock Art in the Eastern Sierra and Great Basin Frontier.  Maturango Museum Publication Number 22.  Maturango Museum, Ridgecrest.  [Lightly edited version of Garfinkel's Ph.D. dissertation.  First detailed synthesis of far southern Sierra and eastern California prehistory.  Focuses on ethnic identification of archaeological patterns and the timing and explanation of  hypothesized prehistoric population movements based on linguistic prehistory.]
Documentary film, Talking Stone:  Rock Art of the Cosos, http://www.talkingstonefilm.com
Garfinkel, Alan and Don Austin 2011 Reproductive Symbolism in Great Basin Rock Art:  Bighorn Sheep Hunting, Fertility, and Forager Ideology.  Cambridge Archaeological Journal 21(3):453-471.
Garfinkel, Alan P., Donald R. Austin, David Earle, and Harold Williams 2009 Myth, Ritual and Rock Art:  Coso Decorated Animal-Humans and the Animal Master. Rock Art Research 26(2).  [The Journal of the Australian Rock Art Research Association (AURA)and of the International Federation of Rock Art Organization (IFRAO)]
Garfinkel, Alan P., Geron Marcom, and Robert A. Schiffman 2007 Culture Crisis and Rock Art Intensification:  Numic Ghost Dance Paintings and Coso Representational Petroglyphs.  American Indian Rock Art Volume 33, Don Christensen and Peggy Whitehead, editors, p. 83-103. American Rock Art Research Association, Tucson, Arizona. Enhanced on-line version available at: https://web.archive.org/web/20130506092308/http://www.petroglyphs.us/article_culture_crisis_and_rock_art_intensification.htm
Garfinkel, Alan P. and J. Kenneth Pringle Dating the Rock Drawings of the Coso Range:  Projectile Point Petroglyphs in American Indian Rock Art Volume 30, James T. O'Connor, editor, pp. 1–14.  Tucson:  American Rock Art Research Association.  R, A, I Enhanced on-line version available at: https://web.archive.org/web/20040829010143/http://petroglyphs.us/article_dating_coso_projectile_point_petroglyphs.htm [Documents petroglyphs in the Coso Range with associated images of dart or arrow points and argues that they most likely represent Elko and Humboldt Basal Notched forms dating the glyphs to a time from calibrated 2000 BC to AD 1.  ]
Garfinkel, Alan P., David A. Young, and Robert M. Yohe, II 2010 Bighorn Hunting, Resource Depression, and Rock Art in the Coso Range of Eastern California:  A Computer Simulation Model.   Journal of Archaeological Science 37:42-51.

External links

Talking Stone - Rock Art of the Cosos Documentary Film
Coso Rock Art and the Coso Bighorn Sheep Cult
Maturango Museum website — offers Coso Rock Art tours''.
Maturango Museum: 7 photos of Coso Rock Art
National Park Service, Archeology Program: Coso Rock Art
Petroglyphs.us: Dating Coso Projectile Points
Naval Air Weapons Station China Lake.mil: Visiting the Coso petroglyphs

Petroglyphs Tour Info
Maturango Museum, 100 E. Las Flores Ave., Ridgecrest, CA 93555; (760) 375-6900, http://www.maturango.org .
Naval Air Weapons Station, (760) 939-1683.
California Rock Art Foundation (805) 312-2261, http://www.californiarockart.org
Rock Art 101 Program, http://www.rockart101.org

Petroglyphs in California
Coso
Native American history of California
History of Inyo County, California
History of the Mojave Desert region
National Historic Landmarks in California
Protected areas of Inyo County, California
Protected areas of the Mojave Desert
Ridgecrest, California
Historic districts on the National Register of Historic Places in California
National Register of Historic Places in Inyo County, California